Michela Pace (born 25 January 2001) is a Maltese singer who won the inaugural season of Malta's version of The X Factor in 2019. As a prize for her win, she represented Malta at the Eurovision Song Contest 2019 with the song "Chameleon" written by Joacim Persson; Paula Winger; Borislav Milanov and Johan Alkenäs, where she finished in 14th place with 107 points. Pace has also secured a contract with Sony Music Italy.

Discography

Singles

Featured singles

Awards 
 2019: Lovin Music Awards - Best Upcoming Female & Best Music Video (Chameleon)
 2020: Malta Music Awards - Breakthrough Artist & Best Video (Chameleon), nominated: Best Song (Chameleon & Cannonball)  
 2020: Bay Music Awards - Best Music Video (Cannonball), nominated: Best Female & Best Song (Cannonball & Say it first)

References

Eurovision Song Contest entrants of 2019
Eurovision Song Contest entrants for Malta
2001 births
Living people
21st-century Maltese women singers
21st-century Maltese singers
Maltese pop singers
People from Gozo